Colcu mac Domnaill (died 580) was a member of the Cenél nEógain branch of the northern Uí Néill. He was the son of Domnall Ilchelgach (died 566) and grandson of Muirchertach mac Muiredaig (died 534) and brother of Eochaid mac Domnaill (died 572), considered high kings of Ireland. He ruled as King of Ailech from 572 to 580.

The high kingship of Ireland rotated between the Cenél nEógain and Cenél Conaill branches in the late 6th century. Áed mac Ainmuirech (died 598) of the Cenél Conaill was high king at this time. Colcu appears to have challenged Áed but was defeated and slain at the Battle of Druim Meic Erce (Drumhirk, modern County Tyrone) in 580.

Notes

References

 Annals of Ulster at CELT: Corpus of Electronic Texts at University College Cork
 Annals of Tigernach at CELT: Corpus of Electronic Texts at University College Cork
 Charles-Edwards, T. M. (2000), Early Christian Ireland, Cambridge: Cambridge University Press, 
 Mac Niocaill, Gearoid (1972), Ireland before the Vikings, Dublin: Gill and Macmillan

External links
CELT: Corpus of Electronic Texts at University College Cork

Kings of Ailech
Year of birth missing
578 deaths
6th-century Irish monarchs